The Protestant Episcopal Cathedral Foundation was chartered by Congress on January 6, 1893, and oversees Washington National Cathedral and its sister institutions. The Bishop of the Episcopal Diocese of Washington serves as its Chief Executive Officer.

The five organizations it oversees are (founding dates in parentheses):
Washington National Cathedral (1893)
National Cathedral School for girls grades 4 to 12 (1900)
St. Albans School for boys grades 4 to 12 (1909)
 Beauvoir, The National Cathedral Elementary School for girls and boys grades pre-K to 3 (1933)
Cathedral College (College of Preachers founded in 1924, consolidated with Cathedral Program & Ministry department in 2004)

References

Episcopal Church (United States)
Organizations established in 1893
Patriotic and national organizations chartered by the United States Congress
Washington National Cathedral